The 2010 Stockholm municipal election was held on 19 September 2010, concurrently with the 2010 Swedish general election.  The election determined how many seats each party would be allocated on the 101-member Stockholm city council (Stockholms kommunfullmäktige) through a system of proportional representation.  A total of 541,716 votes were cast in this election, for a total voter turnout of 81.58%

This election confirmed the trend of the Green Party winning voters in the Swedish capital and other major urban areas in Sweden. The Sweden Democrats - for the first time winning seats in the national parliament - had a significantly lower share of votes in the Stockholm election, receiving only 2.62% of the votes (5.70% on national level).

Results

Election results

References

See also
 Elections in Sweden
 List of political parties in Sweden
 City of Stockholm

Municipal elections in Stockholm
2010 elections in Sweden
2010s in Stockholm
September 2010 events in Europe